The 1971 World Archery Championships was the 26th edition of the event. It was held in York, Great Britain on 18–31 July 1971 and was organised by World Archery Federation (FITA).

The 1971 Championships marked the last competition before archery became an Olympic sport in 1972.

Medals summary

Recurve

Medals table

References

External links
 World Archery website
 Complete results

World Championship
World Archery
A
World Archery Championships
1970s in York
Sport in York
International archery competitions hosted by the United Kingdom